Amin Ahmed Chowdhury was a Bangladeshi army officer and diplomat.

Early life
Chowdhury was born in South Anandpur village of Fulghazi in Feni. He joined Pakistan Army in 1964 and was commissioned in 1966. When the Liberation War of Bangladesh started he join Bangladesh Army in 1971 and took part the war under Z Force and was seriously injured in the combat. After the Pakistan Army surrendered, He was honored as Bir Bikrom, which is the third highest gallantry award in Bangladesh.

After military retirement
Chowdhury held various coveted posts in the government. He was appointed as managing director of Trust for the Welfare of Freedom Fighter, chairman of Bangladesh Tea Board, chairman of Retired Armed Forces Officers Welfare Organization (RAOWA), etc.
Amin also played as pivotal and pioneering role in raising local fund from Bangladeshi expatriates from all walks of life, arranging grants and loans from the Government of Bangladesh and obtaining approvals from governments of Oman.
During his tenure as Ambassador of Bangladesh to Oman he established Bangladesh School Muscat for the Bangladeshi community children's who are residing in Oman. He also contributed in strengthening the brotherly ties between Oman and Bangladesh along with his contribution for the welfare of expatriate Bangladeshis was well acclaimed by the government of Oman.
Government of Oman conferred him with the title 'Al Numan', a prestigious civil order by the Government of Oman. Amin was also acclaimed as security analyst and columnist of leading local and international skills in talk shows of different TV channels on contemporary issues.

Death
Chowdhury reported chest pain when was writing a column. He was rushed to the hospital and where the doctors pronounced him dead. Prime Minister and President paid homage to him and was buried with full military guard of honour in Banani Graveyard on 20 April 2013.

Personal life
Chowdhury had an older brother, Amir Ahmed Chowdhury, who became a prominent academic and cultural figure in Mymensingh, Bangladesh During the War of Liberation, Amir was captured by the Pakistani Army, confined and tortured, but escaped. The Pakistani army raided their home in Feni, and killed their octogenarian grandfather and six other family members.

References

1946 births
2013 deaths
Bangladeshi generals
Pakistan Army officers
People from Feni District
Burials at Banani Graveyard
Bangladesh Army generals
Bangladeshi diplomats
Ambassadors of Bangladesh to Oman
Recipients of the Bir Bikrom
Mukti Bahini personnel